Sébaco is a town and a municipality in the Matagalpa department of Nicaragua.

Situated at the junction of the Pan-American Highway and the Rio Grande de Matagalpa, Sébaco is the largest city of the agricultural Sébaco Valley, one of the most fertile areas in Nicaragua. From Sébaco, vegetable fields extend beyond the horizon when looking west. Five kilometres north of the city, a highway branches east from the Pan-American towards the city of Matagalpa.

King Charles I of Spain named the area "The Very Noble City of Sébaco" by decree.  In 2006 the National Assembly of Nicaragua officially named the city Sébaco.

Geography

Sébaco is located in one of the largest and most fertile valleys of the Nicaraguan interior, approximately 103 kilometers from the capital, Managua. Its territory is crossed by two major rivers: the Old River, which runs north to south through the center of Sébaco Valley, and is a source of hydroelectric power; and the Rio Grande de Matagalpa, which runs from the east to the South West. These two rivers provide irrigation for the vegetables and grain produced in the valley. The largest underground lake in the world is situated underneath this valley. According to legend, the lake formed when a volcano to the south was going to explode, but a priest, guided by his faith, planted a cross on top of the mountain and the volcano subsided. Current studies show the hill contains plentiful amounts of water which travel from the slopes and form springs miles away from the river.

Education

Today there are many schools in and around the municipality, including preschools, kindergartens, and elementary schools.  Secondary and higher education include: Ruben Baltodano Light Baptist School of Truth and Life (ACIBEN), Ruben Dario Secondary Care, Colegio San Luis Gonzaga, Lily of the Valley,  Eddy Alonso Institute (INEA), and the National University College of North (UNN).

Tourism
Sébaco is visited by people who want to shop in malls and shops with goods from all over the Americas. Sébaco has museums that have exhibits in pre-Columbian art as well as art from the colonial period. The valley's natural environment also attracts tourists.

Etymology

The name Sébaco originates from the Nahuatl language, coatl cihuatl, which means snake woman.  Coatl Cihuatl was also the Aztec goddess of fertility and agriculture. When the Spanish arrived in the area, they were unable to pronounce the original name of this town, and over time the pronunciation became Sébaco.

History

Previously, Sébaco was an important ceremonial center of the goddess, Coatl Cihuatl. It was also the center of an important Chiefdom, known as Cihuatl Coatl or Chontales, which was composed of parts of the current departments of Nueva Segovia, Madriz, Estelí, Matagalpa, Jinotega, Boaco, Chontales and Río San Juan. Sébaco was discovered by the Spaniard Gabriel Rojas de Córdoba in 1525, while he was looking for the outlet of Lake Managua. Sébaco quickly became the center of all Spanish military operations and evangelization for northern Nicaragua and southern Honduras. The area witnessed an influx of people in 1833. With the construction of the Pan American Highway in the 1950s, the municipality began to extend over much of the valley.  Today it is one of the most populated areas in northern Nicaragua, and one of the largest producers of rice, beans and onions in Central America.

External links

 Guide on Sébaco

References 

Municipalities of the Matagalpa Department
Valleys of North America
Landforms of Nicaragua